Torgelow is a municipality in the Vorpommern-Greifswald district, in Mecklenburg-Western Pomerania in north-eastern Germany. It is situated on the river Uecker, 12 km south of Ueckermünde, and 41 km northwest of Szczecin, Poland. Torgelow was ranked a city on 4 May 1945.

References

Vorpommern-Greifswald
Populated places established in the 1270s
Duchy of Pomerania
Swedish Pomerania